HMS Hurst Castle (K416) was one of 44 s built for the Royal Navy during World War II. Completed in June 1944, she began escorting convoys in August and was sunk by a German U-boat the following month.

Design and description
The Castle-class corvette was a stretched version of the preceding Flower class, enlarged to improve seakeeping and to accommodate modern weapons. They were powered by a pair of triple-expansion steam engines, each driving one propeller shaft using steam provided by two Admiralty three-drum boilers. The ships' complement was 99 officers and ratings.

The Castle-class ships were equipped with a single QF  Mk XVI gun forward, but their primary weapon was their single three-barrel Squid anti-submarine mortar. This was backed up by one depth charge rail and two throwers for 15 depth charges. The ships were fitted with two twin and a pair of single mounts for  Oerlikon light AA guns. Provision was made for a further four single mounts if needed. They were equipped with Type 145Q and Type 147B ASDIC sets to detect submarines by reflections from sound waves beamed into the water. A Type 277 search radar and a HF/DF radio direction finder rounded out the Castles' sensor suite.

Construction and career
Hurst Castle, the only ship of her name to serve in the Royal Navy, was ordered on 2 February 1943 from Caledon Shipbuilding & Engineering Company and was laid down at their shipyard in Dundee on 6 August. She was launched on 23 February 1944 and was completed on 9 June. The ship sailed to the anti-submarine training base in Tobermory, Mull, HMS Western Isles, for working up. Hurst Castle was assigned to Escort Group B3 on 3 July and escorted Convoy OS 85/KMS 59 from Britain to Gibraltar on 2 August. The group escorted Convoy SL 167/MKS 58 from Gibraltar to the UK later that month.

On 30 August Hurst Castle and her sister ship  departed Derry, Northern Ireland, to rendezvous with Force 33 the following day. The escort destroyer  rescued all 102 survivors.

Citations

Bibliography
 
 
 
 
 

 

Hurst Castle
1944 ships
Hurst Castle
Ships sunk by German submarines in World War II
World War II shipwrecks in the Atlantic Ocean
Royal Navy ship names
Maritime incidents in September 1944